Saint Saviour's Chapel at Harvard-Westlake School in the Studio City section of Los Angeles, California, is a Los Angeles Historic-Cultural Monument (No. #32). The chapel was patterned after the Chapel at Rugby School in England. Its pews face the center aisle, and it is considered an excellent example of the collegiate chapel style. It also features a large rood cross made by students in the school's wood shop. The chapel was built in 1914 at the original campus of the Harvard School at Western Avenue and Venice Boulevard. It was designed by Reginald Johnson, the son of the first Episcopal bishop of Los Angeles. When the campus moved to its present Studio City location in 1937, the chapel was divided into sixteen pieces and moved to the new campus through Sepulveda Pass via Sepulveda Boulevard.

See also
 List of Los Angeles Historic-Cultural Monuments in the San Fernando Valley

References

Buildings and structures in the San Fernando Valley
Los Angeles Historic-Cultural Monuments
Spanish Revival architecture in California
Studio City, Los Angeles
University and college chapels in the United States